American Empire is a French-inspired Neoclassical style of American furniture and decoration that takes its name and originates from the Empire style introduced during the First French Empire period under Napoleon's rule. It gained its greatest popularity in the U.S. after 1820 and is considered the second, more robust phase of the Neoclassical style, which earlier had been expressed in the Adam style in Britain and Louis Seize, or Louis XVI, in France. As an early-19th-century design movement in the United States, it encompassed architecture, furniture and other decorative arts, as well as the visual arts.

In American furniture, the Empire style was most notably exemplified by the work of New York cabinetmakers Duncan Phyfe and Paris-trained Charles-Honoré Lannuier. Other major furniture centers renowned for regional interpretations of the American Empire style were Boston, Philadelphia, and Baltimore.  Many examples of American Empire cabinetmaking are characterized by antiquities-inspired carving, gilt-brass furniture mounts, and decorative inlays such as stamped-brass banding with egg-and-dart, diamond, or Greek-key patterns, or individual shapes such as stars or circles.

The most elaborate furniture in this style was made around 1815-25, often incorporating columns with rope-twist carving, animal-paw feet, anthemion, stars, and acanthus-leaf ornamentation, sometimes in combination with gilding and vert antique (antique green, simulating aged bronze). The Red Room at the White House is a fine example of American Empire style. A simplified version of American Empire furniture, often referred to as the Grecian style, generally displayed plainer surfaces in curved forms, highly figured mahogany veneers, and sometimes gilt-stencilled decorations. Many examples of this style survive, exemplified by massive chests of drawers with scroll pillars and glass pulls, work tables with scroll feet and fiddleback chairs. Elements of the style enjoyed a brief revival in the 1890s with, particularly, chests of drawers and vanities or dressing tables, usually executed in oak and oak veneers.

This Americanized interpretation of the Empire style continued in popularity in conservative regions outside the major metropolitan centers well past the mid-nineteenth century.

See also
 Federal furniture
 Lighthouse clock
 Classical American Homes Preservation Trust

References
Furniture - Empire style, buffaloah.com.

Decorative arts
History of furniture
Architectural styles
American art movements